The 2007 America East Conference baseball tournament took place from May 24 through 26 at Farmingdale State Baseball Stadium in Farmingdale, New York. The top four regular season finishers of the league's seven teams qualified for the double-elimination tournament. In the championship game, third-seeded Albany defeated first-seeded Binghamton, 1-0, to win its first tournament championship. As a result, Albany received the America East's automatic bid to the 2007 NCAA Tournament, the program's first.

Seeding 
The top four finishers from the regular season were seeded one through four based on conference winning percentage only. They then played in a double-elimination format. In the first round, the one and four seeds were matched up in one game, while the two and three seeds were matched up in the other.

Results

All-Tournament Team 
The following players were named to the All-Tournament Team.

Most Outstanding Player 
Albany pitcher Cory Warring was named Most Outstanding Player.

References 

America East Conference Baseball Tournament
Tournament
American East Conference baseball tournament
America East Conference baseball tournament
College baseball tournaments in New York (state)